Charles Wilson "Charley" Ford (July 9, 1857 – May 6, 1884) was an outlaw, and member of the James Gang. He was the lesser known brother of Robert Ford, the killer of Jesse James. Charlie Ford was introduced to Jesse and Frank James by Wood Hite and he joined the gang.

In 1882 Jesse James recruited Robert and Charles Ford to help with a planned robbery of another bank. Thomas T. Crittenden offered $10,000 for the capture of Jesse James, and on April 3, 1882, Robert Ford shot Jesse James. He and Charles Ford were convicted and were sentenced to be hanged, but were pardoned by Crittenden.

Afterwards, Charles heard a rumor that Frank James was searching for both with plans of mortal revenge. Two years later, after a period of deep depression following James' death, terminal illness from tuberculosis, and a debilitating morphine addiction, Charles Ford died by suicide on May 6, 1884. He was interred in Richmond Cemetery.

Family 
Charles Ford was one of the eleven Ford children born to James Thomas Ford and Mary Ann Bruin:

 Sarah J. Ford (b. abt. 1841)
 Georgiana Ford (b. abt. 1843) 
 Mary T. Ford (b. abt. 1845)
 John Thomas Ford (b: November 6, 1847)
 Martha Elizabeth Ford (b: April 22, 1849)
 Harriet Ford (b. abt. 1851)
 Elias Capline Ford (b: July 10, 1853)
 Amanda Francis Ford (b: April 1, 1855)
 Charles Wilson Ford (b: July 9, 1857)
 Wilber Pottuck Ford (b: November 19, 1859)
 Robert Newton Ford (b: January 31, 1862)

In popular culture 
 Charles Tannen portrayed Charles Ford in Jesse James (1939) and The Return of Frank James (1940).
 Tommy Noonan portrayed Charles Ford in I Shot Jesse James (1949) and The Return of Jesse James (1950).
 Louis Jean Heydt portrayed Charles Ford in The Great Missouri Raid (1951).
 Paul Frees portrayed Charles Ford on the CBS radio show Crime Classics on July 20, 1953 in the episode entitled The Death of a Picture Hanger.
 Frank Gorshin portrayed Charles Ford in The True Story of Jesse James (1957).
 Christopher Guest portrayed Charles Ford in The Long Riders (1980).
 Alexis Arquette portrayed Charles Ford in Frank & Jesse (1994).
 Sam Rockwell portrayed Charles Ford in The Assassination of Jesse James by the Coward Robert Ford (2007), based on the novel by Ron Hansen.
Charles Ford is mentioned in the Grateful Dead song Tennessee Jed.
Alex Rose portrayed Charles Ford in the Timeless episode, The Murder of Jesse James (2017).

See also 
 Dick Liddil

References 

1857 births
1884 deaths
James–Younger Gang
Suicides by firearm in Missouri
1880s suicides